Celeste Vatatono Cossa was a Mozambican politician. In 1977 she was one of the first group of women elected to the People's Assembly.

Biography
Originally from Chibuto, Cossa worked in the cotton growing sector, which had been forced upon areas of the country by the Portuguese authorities. She was a FRELIMO candidate in the 1977 parliamentary elections, in which she was one of the first group of 27 women elected to the People's Assembly.

References

Date of birth unknown
20th-century Mozambican women politicians
20th-century Mozambican politicians
FRELIMO politicians
Members of the Assembly of the Republic (Mozambique)
Possibly living people
People from Gaza Province